, also spelled , is a traditional building technique used in regions such as Caldas, which is one of the 32 departments of Colombia. , which came from the word , is an old Spanish term for walls made of bamboo ( in Spanish) and soil. Guadua is a common woody grass found in Colombia. 

Based on Jorge Enrique Robledo's book, Muñoz points out that this traditional technique of building evolved in Caldas from the first buildings constructed during the 1840s through the introduction of new materials, creating different typologies. All of these typologies typically use stone foundations. These typologies are: 1. , 2. , 3. , and 4. .  Each typology has a different structural design. For instance,  uses bamboo in both the frame and the structural panels and the plaster, and according to Sarmiento, is made from a mixture of earth and cattle dung.  uses wood in the frame and bamboo in its structural panels, and the plaster is made by a kind of “reinforced cement” because of the use of steel mat between the bamboo panels and the cement plaster.

In the 1840s, the first settlers of Manizales, the capital city of Caldas, used  in buildings that were usually single story. At the same time, in the rural areas, some farmers used a mix of traditional building styles. In 1993, Robledo called this variation . The name derives from the fact that this new technique of  had better performance in the earthquakes (Spanish  meaning 'earthquake') since the first floor, which was rigid, absorbed the seismic energy, and the second floor, which was flexible, dissipated the energy. Those built with Estilo Temblorero remained standing.

These new techniques, which used concrete frames and  facades and structural panels, were the most common structural designs in the reconstruction of the downtown that was swept by the great fires.

See also 

 Adobe

Footnotes

Works cited 

 
 
 

Indigenous architecture of the Americas
Architecture in Colombia
Building materials
Sustainable building